Little Big Star is a singing contest aired every Saturday afternoon on ABS-CBN in the Philippines and worldwide on The Filipino Channel. The show was hosted by a Filipina singer and actress Sarah Geronimo.  the series premiered on Saturday, from September 24, 2005, to February 3, 2007, replacing Hoy Gising! Kapamilya and was replaced by Little Big Superstar. The show features aspiring young singers who battle it out each week to become the next Little Big Star.

The "Little Big Star" competition is divided into two "divisions"; the Little Division for contestants ages 6 to 9 years old and the Big Division with contestants ages 10 to 13 years old.

Hosts

Sarah Geronimo
Sarah Geronimo heads the nationwide broadcast of Little Big Star. In Little Big Star Manila, finalists from the regional shows are sent to battle in the grand finals.

Sarah herself won a singing competition, IBC 13's Star for a Night.

Sheryn Regis
Sheryn Regis is the host of Little Big Star Cebu, aired on ABS-CBN Channel 3 Cebu. LBS Cebu was recognized as the fourth top-rating show in ABS-CBN's Nationwide Charts.

Sheryn won 1st runner-up in Star in a Million back in 2004.

Nikki Bacolod
Nikki Bacolod is the face and voice behind Little Big Star Davao, airing on ABS-CBN Channel 4 Davao. Nikki placed 2nd to Jerome Sala in Search for the Star in a Million (Season 2), which coincidentally, Sarah was also hosting with her co-champions.

Season one
In the first season, contestants competed each week to become part of the Honor Roll.  Those in the Honor Roll at the end of the month would compete in the Monthly Finals for the title of "Star of the Month."  The "Star of the Month" would secure a spot in the finals.

Little Star TOP 25
 Rhap Salazar
 Makisig Morales
 Kyle Balili
 Sam Concepcion
 Micah Torre
 Randy De Silva
 Jaya Sto. Domingo
 Shane Velasco
 Charice Pempengco (now Jake Zyrus)
 Katrina Velarde
 Nicole Marasigan
 Andrea Mendoza
 Kiara Dominante
 Medzar Oroña
 Leo Padilla
 Mark Venzon Madriaga
 Shane Gonzales
 Ralph Morris
 Christian Leroi
 Mackenzie De Guzman
 Clarence Torres
 Mico Dela Pena
 Nikka Del Valle
 Ciara Santos
 Alexander Gomez
 Tricia Delos Santos
 Jhonifer Alvaire Cruz
 Andrew Mariano
 Lorenz Sarrondo

Little Division Grand Finalists
Rhap Salazar-  Brightest Star
 Makisig Morales- 2nd Honor
 Kyle Balili- 3rd Honor
 Micah Torre- 4th
 Nic Jim Oliver- 5th
 Jaya Sto. Domingo- 6th
 Shane Velasco- 7th

Big Division Grand Finalists
 Sam Concepcion - Brightest Star
 Gian Barbarona - 2nd Honor
 Charice Pempengco - 3rd Honor
 Rachel Pegason- 4th
 Ronald Humarang- 5th
 Carl Camo- 6th
 Melvin Rimas- 7th

Season two
Season 2 began the week after the grand finals of season 1. After a little over two months of competition, ABS-CBN pulled the plug on the series after experiencing a decline in ratings as well as the network focusing on its new talent search, Pinoy Dream Academy. The season 2 grand finals aired on Saturday, July 1, 2006.

Little Division Grand Finalists
 Robert Villar - Brightest Star
 Christian Rico B. Olog - 2nd Honor

Big Division Grand Finalists
 Angellie Urquico (Now Anja Aguilar) - Brightest Star
 Krisshajene "Khrissha" Viaje- 2nd Honor
 Dawn Amber Cortes- 3rd Honor
 Rafael Canillas - 4th Honor
 Laurice Bermillo- 5th Honor

After Little Big Star
A few of the first-season contestants have gone on to other projects at ABS-CBN. Both Sam Concepcion and Makisig Morales were offered lead roles in the network's newest fantaserye, Super Inggo, long before the finals even began. Meanwhile, Micah Torre was cast in host Sarah Geronimo's new soap opera Bituing Walang Ningning. Season 2's Robert Villar starred as Berto on Calla Lily, while Micah Torre and Kyle Balili sang the theme song for that soap opera. Villar is the only contestant who transferred from ABS-CBN to GMA Network. The other finalists have performed on the 2nd season of "Little Big Star" and a few other ABS-CBN programs. Kyle Balili appeared in the new soap opera Sana Maulit Muli.

Charice Pempengco has also made a name for herself worldwide with her performances that were shown on YouTube. She has made appearances in The Ellen DeGeneres Show, The Oprah Winfrey Show, The Paul O'Grady Show, Good Morning America, and the Macy's Thanksgiving Day Parade. She has also shared the spotlight with the likes of Josh Groban, Celine Dion and Andrea Bocelli, just to name a few. She released her self-titled international album CHARICE under the guidance of her mentor, David Foster. Her album made it to the #8 spot on the US Billboard chart, making her the first Asian artist in history to make it to the Billboard Top Ten. In June 2010, it was announced that Charice landed a recurring guest role in the hit Fox TV series Glee.

Other finalists who appeared in Little Big Star are also participating in various local reality shows and talent searches. A reality talent search on TV5 called Star Factor. These include Krissha Viaje (who finished second place in the second season of Little Big Star) who finished seventh. Morissette (who was a finalist in Little Big Star Cebu) made it to second place in Star Factor, and years later went on to be a semi-finalist in the first season of The Voice Of The Philippines.

On the other hand, former Big Division contestants of the first season Alyssa Kate Quijano, Jennifer Maravilla, and Katrina Velarde formed a singing trio called New Born Divas where they made it to the grand finals of the second season of Talentadong Pinoy in TV5. In 2010, Alyssa Quijano has crowned the winner of the teen category of Karaoke Next Level Under Worlds of fun. Later on, Alyssa Kate Quijano and Katrina Velarde joined the first season of the X-Factor Philippines and formed a group there called AKA JAM and later placed 10th.

Also, Laurice Bermillo (fourth place in Little Big Star Season 2) made it as a contender in Star Power and finished 9th. and Akiko Solon (a monthly finalist in Little Big Star Cebu) who finished 5th in the said singing contest.

Angellie Urquico, the winner of little big star season 2 big division, later signed a contract with ABS-CBN's ASAP under her new screen name Anja Aguilar.

Releases

References

See also
 Little Big Superstar
 List of programs broadcast by ABS-CBN

Philippine reality television series
Singing talent shows
2005 Philippine television series debuts
2007 Philippine television series endings
ABS-CBN original programming
Filipino-language television shows
Television series about children
Television series about teenagers